Stephen III may refer to:
Pope Stephen II, aka Stephen III, (d. 757), pope of the Roman Catholic Church 
Pope Stephen III (720–772), native of Sicily
Stephen III of Iberia, Guaramid dynasty, presiding prince of Iberia (Kartli, eastern Georgia) from 779/780 to 788
Stephen III of Naples (died 832), duke of Naples
Stephen III of Hungary (1147–1172), King of Hungary and Croatia
Stefan Dragutin of Serbia, Stephen III of Serbia (died in 1316)
Stephen III, Duke of Bavaria (1337–1413)
Stephen III Báthory (died 1444), Hungarian nobleman and commander, Palatine of Hungary
Stephen III of Moldavia (c. 1433 – 1504), aka Stephen the Great, Prince of Moldavia

eo:Stefano#Regantoj